Manderson is a surname. Notable people with the surname include:

 Bert Manderson (1893–1946), Northern Irish footballer
 Charles F. Manderson (1837–1911), United States Senator from Nebraska
 Floyd Manderson, British Olympic high jumper, Seoul Olympics 1988
 Sandra Manderson, police officer and police commander from New Zealand
 Tobias Manderson-Galvin (born 1984), Australian actor, satirist, performance poet, dadaist and playwright
 Professor Green, stage name of Stephen Paul Manderson, British rapper